Kusada is a Local Government Area in Katsina State, Nigeria. Its headquarters are in the town of Kusada.

The major ethnic groups are Hausa and Fulani.

Its major Villages includes: Dudunni, Dangamau, Yashe, Mawashi, kofar, Kaikai. The people of Kusada local government are mostly farmers and herdsmen. Their standard of living is well improved as the government had since provided them with social amenities such as, Schools, Hospitals, good tarred roads, boreholes (both manual and solar system), farm boreholes, dams, well organized local markets etc.

Both Government burden and day Secondary and Primary Schools, are located in the Town and some major villages in the local government. The local government is also characterized with government residential area, beautiful jumu'at mosques, good township roads and well named and numbered streets.

It has an area of 390 km and a population of 199,267 at the 2006 census.

The postal code of the area is 833.

References

Local Government Areas in Katsina State